Route 580, or Highway 580, may refer to:

Canada
 Alberta Highway 580
 New Brunswick Route 580
 Ontario Highway 580

United Kingdom
 A580 road

United States
  I-580
Interstate 580 (California), a spur connecting the San Francisco Bay Area to the San Joaquin Valley from U.S. Route 101 to Interstate 5
Interstate 580 (Nevada), a spur connecting Carson City, Nevada to Reno, Nevada (also signed as U.S. Route 395)
Interstate 580 (Nebraska), a former route and now part of U.S. Route 75 in Omaha, Nebraska